Dysschema luctuosum is a moth of the family Erebidae first described by Paul Dognin in 1919. It is found along the south-eastern coast of Brazil, from Rio de Janeiro to Santa Catarina.

The male hindwings have two forms: melanic and with a white ground colour.

References

Moths described in 1919
Dysschema